Dato Sri Lee Kim Shin (born 28 February 1950), is a Malaysian politician who has served as State Minister of Transport of Sarawak in the Gabungan Parti Sarawak (GPS) state administration under Chief Minister Abang Abdul Rahman Johari Abang Openg since August 2019 and Member of the Sarawak State Legislative Assembly (MLA) for Senadin since September 1996. He is a member of the Sarawak United Peoples' Party (SUPP), a component party of the ruling GPS coalition.

Education
Lee graduated from the University of Science, Malaysia (USM) with a Bachelor of Social Science (B.Soc.Sc.) (Hons). He was also conferred with a Doctor of Letters honoris causa from Curtin University, Western Australia.

Election results

Honours
  :
  Officer of the Order of the Defender of the Realm (KMN) (2000)
  Commander of the Order of Meritorious Service (PJN) – Datuk (2006)

  :
  Knight of the Most Exalted Order of the Star of Sarawak (BBS) (1984)
  Meritorious Service Medal-Silver Civil Administration Medal (Sarawak) (PPB) (1990)
  Officer of the Most Exalted Order of the Star of Sarawak (PBS) (1995)
  Knight Commander of the Most Exalted Order of the Star of Sarawak (PNBS) – Dato Sri (2021)

See also
 Senadin (state constituency)

References

Malaysian people of Hakka descent
21st-century Malaysian politicians
Officers of the Order of the Defender of the Realm
Living people
Sarawak United Peoples' Party politicians
1949 births
Malaysian politicians of Chinese descent
Members of the Sarawak State Legislative Assembly
People from Sarawak
People from Miri
Universiti Sains Malaysia alumni
Knights Commander of the Most Exalted Order of the Star of Sarawak
Commanders of the Order of Meritorious Service